Oğuzhan Azğar (born 14 July 1993) is a Turkish footballer who plays as a centre-back for Ankara Adliyespor. He made his Süper Lig debut for Samsunspor against Galatasaray on 7 January 2012.

References

External links
 
 
 

1993 births
Living people
Sportspeople from Samsun
Turkish footballers
Turkey youth international footballers
Samsunspor footballers
Akhisarspor footballers
Süper Lig players
Association football central defenders
Association football defenders